Edward Clement Evelyn (18 November 1862 – 5 May 1936) was a Welsh international footballer. He was part of the Wales national football team, playing 1 match on 26 February 1887 against England.

On club level he played for Crusaders.

He emigrated to the United States and died in Nebraska in 1936. A newspaper obituary of his death claimed dubiously that he was the son of a Lord Evelyn. He had two brothers. Francis was a first-class cricketer, while William was a historian.

See also
 List of Wales international footballers (alphabetical)

References

External links

 
 

1862 births
Welsh footballers
Wales international footballers
1936 deaths
Crusaders F.C. (London) players
Association football defenders
Burials in Nebraska